Smoke This is the third studio album by American rock band Lynch Mob, released in 1999. After the second breakup of the original line up in 1998, George Lynch reformed the band with all unknown members, taking the music into a rap metal/nu metal direction.

Track listing

Personnel
George Lynch – guitars
Gabe Rosales – bass guitar
Kirk Harper – vocals
Clancy McCarthy – drums

Additional personnel
Mike Rehmer – art direction
Tom Baker – mastering

References

Lynch Mob (band) albums
1999 albums